Andrea Amort (born 1958,  Linz) is an Austrian dance critic, dance historian, playwright, festival and exhibition curator as well as a non-fiction writer.

Life
Andrea Amort studied modern dance and classical ballet with Erika Gangl and Andrei Jerschik in Linz, and Theatre Studies at the University of Vienna, where she received her doctorate in 1982 with a thesis on the story of the ballet of the Vienna State Opera from 1918 to 1942.

From 1981 to 2009, she was a dance critic and sometimes also an editor and deputy director of the cultural department of Vienna's Daily Kurier. Presently she writes for international media and trade magazines.

After teaching at the Anton Bruckner Private University for Music, Drama, and Dance, she moved in 2003 to the Music and Arts University of the City of Vienna. She has lectured in London, Oxford and Paris and teaches at the University of Zurich, as well as working on documentary films.

From 2009, she has worked as a curator for theatre, dance and performance on behalf of Vienna, where she currently lives.

Artistic director of performance projects and festivals

 Viennese dance in exile: Lecture and Performance Series in cooperation, inter alia, with the Kunstverein Alte Schmiede and the Jewish Museum in Vienna since 1998, with the focus on biographies and work of dancers and choreographers Hanna Berger, Gertrud Bodenwieser, Magda Brunner-Hoyos, Hilde Holger, Gertrud Kraus, Stella Mann, Hedi Pope, Cilli Wang, Wera Goldman and Shona Dunlop MacTavish.
 Dance in exile: exhibition at the Austrian Theatre Museum, lecture series and dance program in collaboration with the Festival tanz2000.at & ImPulsTanz in Viennese Akademietheater, with works by Hanna Berger, Gertrud Bodenwieser, Andrei Jerschik, and Pola Nirenska. 
 Hanna Berger: Retouchings. Scenic Project with works by Nikolaus Adler, Manfred Aichinger, Bernd Roger Bienert, Rose Breuss and Willi Dorner (Festspielhaus, St. Pölten, 2006), Theatre Odeon, Vienna 2008, Posthof Line (2009), ImPulsTanz Festival (2010).
 Beyond the Waltz Festival, co-curated by George Jackson, in cooperation with the Austrian Cultural Forum in Washington (2006).
 Touches Festival. Dance before 1938-, Dance today. 33 Events. Theatre Odeon and other places, Vienna (2008).

Publications

Books

Posts (selection)
 
 
 
 
 
 
 
 
 
  
 Auch Richard Strauss wollte den Tanz erneuern. Wie Choreograf Heinrich Kröller die Josephs Legende ab 1921 in Mitteleuropa durchsetzte. In: Worte klingen, Töne sprechen. Richard Strauss und die Oper. Hg. v. Christiane Mühlegger-Henhapel u. Alexandra Steiner-Strauss. Symposium anlässlich der Richard Strauss-Ausstellung im Theatermuseum Wien, 22.–23. Jänner 2015. Wien, Holzhausen, 2015, S. 125–137, 
 Das Tanz-Theater der Anita Berber. Der Körper als Fratze. In: gift. zeitschrift für freies theater, Wien, 01/2015, S. 16–19. ISSN 1992-2973

References

External links
 Literature from and about Andrea Amort in the German National Library
 Short biography and reviews related to works by Andrea Amort at perlentaucher.de
 Andrea Amort on the website of the Music and Arts University of the City of Vienna and on the website of tanznetz.de

1958 births
Living people
Austrian curators
Austrian non-fiction writers
Austrian women dramatists and playwrights
Austrian expatriates in Switzerland
Dance critics
Dance historians
University of Vienna alumni
Academic staff of the University of Zurich
21st-century Austrian dramatists and playwrights
21st-century Austrian women writers
Academic staff of Anton Bruckner Private University